Leslie Ruthven Pym (24 May 1884 – 17 July 1945) was a Conservative Party politician in the United Kingdom.

The son of the Right Reverend Walter Ruthven Pym, Bishop of Bombay, Pym was educated at Bedford School and Magdalene College, Cambridge. He was elected as Member of Parliament (MP) for Monmouth in Wales at a by-election in 1939.  He represented the constituency in the House of Commons until his death during the 1945 general election. Polling took place on 5 July 1945. Pym died 12 days later, but nine days before the declaration of the result. He was declared posthumously elected on 26 July 1945, provoking a by-election in his Monmouth constituency. That contest was won by Peter Thorneycroft.

Leslie Pym died on 17 July 1945, three days before his brother, Revd Canon Thomas Wentworth Pym, and, coincidentally, on the same day as Sir Edward Campbell, the member for Bromley, who was also posthumously elected.

In the war-time coalition government, he was a government whip.

Pym was not a descendant of the 17th century Parliamentarian John Pym. His son Francis (1922–2008) was later a Conservative MP and Cabinet minister.

References

External links 
 

1884 births
1945 deaths
Alumni of Magdalene College, Cambridge
Conservative Party (UK) MPs for Welsh constituencies
Ministers in the Churchill wartime government, 1940–1945
People educated at Bedford School
Politicians elected posthumously
UK MPs 1935–1945
UK MPs 1945–1950
Ministers in the Churchill caretaker government, 1945